Courtney Paris (born September 21, 1987) is an American basketball coach and former player. She is currently an assistant coach for the Dallas Wings of the WNBA. She last played as a center for the Seattle Storm of the Women's National Basketball Association (WNBA). She is best known for her accomplishments during her college career at the University of Oklahoma, where she holds career averages of 21.4 points and 15.3 rebounds per game. She holds the NCAA record for most consecutive double-doubles at 112. During her senior season in 2009, Paris received considerable media attention when she announced that she would pay back her tuition to the University of Oklahoma if the Sooners did not win the 2009 NCAA Women's Division I Basketball Tournament. She would lead Oklahoma to the Final Four before falling short to eventual national runner-up Louisville. Paris was selected with the number seven overall pick by the now-defunct Sacramento Monarchs in the 2009 WNBA Draft.

Early life
Paris was born in San Jose, California.

Paris' twin sister Ashley Paris is also a basketball player. In addition to being a twin, Paris has four brothers: Wayne, David, Austin and Brandon.  She has two half-brothers (Bubba's sons) William III and Christian.  Her parents are Lynne Gray and former NFL player William "Bubba" Paris.

Paris transferred from Modesto Christian High School to Piedmont High School and then Millennium High School in Piedmont, California, at the start of the 2002–2003 year. Paris was named a WBCA All-American. She participated in the 2005 WBCA High School All-America Game, where she scored three points. Paris chose Oklahoma over UConn, California, Texas, UCLA, and Syracuse.

College career
Paris is the only player in NCAA history, male or female, to have 700 points, 500 rebounds, and 100 blocks in a season.  In 2005–06, Paris set the women's NCAA record for rebounds in a single season, with 539.  She holds the NCAA record for most consecutive double-doubles at 112 games, a streak which ended on February 2, 2009 against Pat Summitt and the Tennessee Lady Volunteers; however, Oklahoma won the game, denying Summitt her 1000th career victory. On February 8, 2009, Paris broke the record for most career NCAA Division I rebounds, formerly held by Wanda Ford of Drake. In the Sooners' victory in the semifinals of the Oklahoma City Regional in the 2009 NCAA Tournament against Pitt on March 29, she became the first player in U.S. college basketball history—regardless of sex, governing body, or division—with 2,500 points and 2,000 rebounds in her career.

Paris also became the first freshman named to the Associated Press All-American team in 2006, and again made the team in 2007. In April 2007, Paris was named the 2007 Associated Press Women's basketball player of the year. She is the first sophomore ever to win the AP Player of the year award. She won All-American honors again her junior year, and as a senior she became the first four-time first-team All-American in women's basketball history. She also won the Lowe's Senior CLASS Award, recognizing her as the nation's top senior women's basketball player.

At Oklahoma, Paris majored in journalism.

Paris had announced that if Oklahoma did not win the NCAA championship in 2009, her final year, she would repay her scholarship — worth about $64,000 in out-of-state tuition — to the university. She said that without a championship, "I don’t feel like I’ve earned it.”

On Sunday April 5, 2009, Oklahoma lost to the Louisville Cardinals 61–59. In a post-game interview with ESPN, Paris was asked if she would make do on her promise to repay her $64,000 basketball scholarship. She replied that she would but that it would take her some time. A week later, the university said that she did not have to repay her scholarship.

Oklahoma statistics
Source

USA Basketball
Paris was a member of the USA Women's U18 team which won the gold medal at the FIBA Americas Championship in Mayaguez, Puerto Rico. The event was held in August 2004, when the USA team defeated Puerto Rico to win the championship. Paris was the second leading scorer for the team, averaging 15.8 points per game.

Paris continued with the team as it became the U19 team, and competed in the 2005 U19 World Championships in Tunis, Tunisia. The USA team won all eight games, winning the gold medal. Paris was the third leading scorer for the team, averaging 12.1 points per game and tied for the lead in rebounding with 7.0 rebounds per game.

Professional career
Paris was selected by the Sacramento Monarchs at No. 7 pick in the 2009 WNBA Draft and her sister was drafted to the Los Angeles Sparks.

On December 14, 2009 the WNBA held a dispersal draft for the Monarchs' players. Courtney was taken with the fourth pick by the Chicago Sky. On May 12, 2010, Paris was waived by the Sky.

On February 8, 2011 she signed a free agent contract with the Los Angeles Sparks and on June 2, she was waived.

Paris signed with the Tulsa Shock in 2012. She led the WNBA in rebounding averaging 10.2 per game in 2014 and 9.3 per game in 2015.

On February 2, 2018, Paris signed a multi-year contract with the Seattle Storm.

See also
 List of NCAA Division I women's basketball players with 2,500 points and 1,000 rebounds

References

External links
USA Basketball profile
Oklahoma Sooners bio
San Francisco Chronicle: Girls Player of the Year: Courtney Paris

1987 births
Living people
All-American college women's basketball players
American expatriate basketball people in China
American expatriate basketball people in Israel
American expatriate basketball people in Spain
American expatriate basketball people in Turkey
American women's basketball players
Atlanta Dream players
Basketball players from San Jose, California
Botaş SK players
Centers (basketball)
Dallas Wings players
Hatay Büyükşehir Belediyesi (women's basketball) players
McDonald's High School All-Americans
Mersin Büyükşehir Belediyesi women's basketball players
Oklahoma Sooners women's basketball coaches
Oklahoma Sooners women's basketball players
Parade High School All-Americans (girls' basketball)
People from Piedmont, California
Sacramento Monarchs players
Seattle Storm players
Shanxi Flame players
Sportspeople from Alameda County, California
Tulsa Shock players
American twins
Twin sportspeople